The Great Hospital Mystery is a 1937 American crime film directed by James Tinling and written by Bess Meredyth, William M. Conselman and Jerome Cady. The film stars Jane Darwell, Sig Ruman, Sally Blane, Thomas Beck, Joan Davis and William Demarest. It was released on May 14, 1937, by 20th Century Fox.

This is one of six mystery movies based on Mignon G. Eberhart's stories about nurse-sleuth Sarah Keate, but the character's name was altered slightly in some of these films. In this one, she is called Sarah Keats.

Plot

Cast   
 Jane Darwell as Miss Sarah Keats
 Sig Ruman as Dr. Taggert 
 Sally Blane as Ann Smith
 Thomas Beck as Dr. David McKerry
 Joan Davis as Flossie Duff
 William Demarest as Mr. Beatty
 George Walcott as Allen Tracy
 Wade Boteler as Det. Lt. Mattoon
 Howard Phillips as Tom Kirby

References

External links 
 

1937 films
20th Century Fox films
American crime films
1937 crime films
Films set in hospitals
Films directed by James Tinling
American black-and-white films
1930s English-language films
1930s American films